Lyle Blackburn (born Robert Lyle Steadham; October 23, 1966) is an American musician and author. Blackburn has authored four books and either narrated or produced several documentary films related to cryptids, and has been a speaker at multiple cryptozoology and Bigfoot-related conventions.

Biography 
Blackburn authored The Beast of Boggy Creek: The True Story of the Fouke Monster, a 2012 book about the Fouke Monster, and is a writer for Rue Morgue magazine. He has narrated three documentary films: The Mothman of Point Pleasant (2017, and for which he was also executive producer and co-writer), The Bray Road Beast (2018), and Terror in the Skies (2019). He also co-produced the 2016 film Boggy Creek Monster.

As a musician, Blackburn started with the group Solitude Aeturnus (1988–1995), first as the drummer and then as the bassist. He left to found The Killcreeps (1996) and then later the band Ghoultown (1999), of which he is currently the lead singer/guitarist. He has one sister.

Discography

With Solitude Aeturnus 
 Demo 1989 (Demo) (1989), drums
 Into the Depths of Sorrow (1991), bass
 Beyond the Crimson Horizon (1992), bass
 Promo (Demo) (1993), vocals (additional), bass
 Through the Darkest Hour (1994), bass
 Days of Doom (Video/VHS) (1994), bass
 The New Wave of American True Meta (Split) (Solitude Aeturnus and Iron Rainbow album) (1996), bass
 Downfall (1996), bass

The Killcreeps 
 Destroy Earth (1997)

Ghoultown 
 Boots of Hell (1999)
 Tales from the Dead West (2000)
 Give 'Em More Rope (2002)
 Live from Texas! (2004)
 Bury Them Deep (2006)
 Life After Sundown (2008)
 Skeleton Cowboys (2008)
 Mistress of the Dark (2009)
 The Unforgotten: Rare & Un-Released (2012)
 Ghost of the Southern Son (2017)
 Curse of Eldorado (2020)

Filmography

Film

Television

Bibliography
 The Beast of Boggy Creek: The True Story of the Fouke Monster  (Anomalist Books, Mar 1, 2012) 
 Lizard Man: The True Story of the Bishopville Monster  (Anomalist Books, October 31, 2013)
 Beyond Boggy Creek: In Search of the Southern Sasquatch (Anomalist Books, February 1, 2017)
 Momo: The Strange Case of the Missouri Monster (Anomalist Books, February 26, 2019)

References

External links 
 
 

1967 births
Living people
People from Fort Worth, Texas
Musicians from Texas
Male actors from Texas
Writers from Texas